The 40th Annual Grammy Awards were held on February 25, 1998, at Radio City Music Hall, New York City. They recognized accomplishments by musicians from the previous year. Rock icon Bob Dylan, Alison Krauss & Union Station, and R. Kelly were the main recipients with three awards each.

Performers 
 Will Smith – Men In Black/Gettin' Jiggy Wit It
 R. Kelly – I Believe I Can Fly
 Fiona Apple – Criminal
 Fleetwood Mac – Rhiannon/Go Your Own Way/Don't Stop
 Celine Dion – My Heart Will Go On
 LeAnn Rimes – How Do I Live
 Lilith Fair Tribute: Paula Cole – Where Have All The Cowboys Gone, Shawn Colvin – Sunny Came Home & Sarah McLachlan – Building A Mystery
 Hanson – MMMBop
 Vince Gill – Pretty Little Adriana
 Tim McGraw & Faith Hill – It's Your Love
 Aretha Franklin – Respect/Nessun Dorma
 Erykah Badu & Wyclef Jean – On & On/Gone 'Till November
 Bob Dylan – Love Sick

Presenters 
 Chris Rock & Vanessa Williams – Best Rap Solo Performance
 Gloria Estefan & Dwight Yoakam – Best Female Country Vocal Performance
 Mike Myers & Jewel – Best R&B Album
 Erykah Badu & Wyclef Jean – Song of the Year
 Missy Elliott & LL Cool J – Best Male R&B Vocal Performance
 Tim McGraw & Faith Hill – Best Male Country Vocal Performance
 Danny De Vito & Puff Daddy – Best Pop Collaboration with Vocals
 Deana Carter & Julio Iglesias – Best Pop Performance by a Duo or Group with Vocals
 Aretha Franklin & Blues Brothers – Best New Artist
 Boyz II Men & Tara Lipinski – Best Pop Vocal Album
 Kelsey Grammer & Bette Midler – Record of the Year
 Usher, Sheryl Crow & John Fogerty – Album of the Year

Award winners

General 
 Record of the Year
 "Sunny Came Home" – Shawn Colvin; John Leventhal, producer
 "Where Have All the Cowboys Gone?" – Paula Cole; Paula Cole, producer
 "Everyday Is a Winding Road" – Sheryl Crow; Sheryl Crow, producer
 "MMMBop" – Hanson; The Dust Brothers, producers
 "I Believe I Can Fly" – R. Kelly; R. Kelly, producer

 Album of the Year
 Time Out of Mind – Bob Dylan; Daniel Lanois, producer The Day – Babyface; Babyface, producer
 This Fire – Paula Cole; Paula Cole, producer
 Flaming Pie – Paul McCartney; Jeff Lynne, George Martin & Paul McCartney, producers
 OK Computer – Radiohead; Nigel Godrich & Radiohead, producers

 Song of the Year
 "Sunny Came Home" – Shawn Colvin & John Leventhal, songwriters (Shawn Colvin) "Don't Speak" – Eric Stefani & Gwen Stefani, songwriters (No Doubt)
 "How Do I Live" – Diane Warren, songwriter (LeAnn Rimes & Trisha Yearwood)
 "I Believe I Can Fly" – R. Kelly, songwriter (R. Kelly)
 "Where Have All the Cowboys Gone?" – Paula Cole, songwriter (Paula Cole)

 Best New Artist
 Paula Cole Fiona Apple
 Erykah Badu
 Puff Daddy
 Hanson

 Pop 
 Best Female Pop Vocal Performance
 "Building a Mystery" – Sarah McLachlan "Butterfly" – Mariah Carey
 "Where Have All the Cowboys Gone?" – Paula Cole
 "Sunny Came Home" – Shawn Colvin
 "Foolish Games" – Jewel

 Best Male Pop Vocal Performance
 "Candle in the Wind 1997" – Elton John "Every Time I Close My Eyes" – Babyface
 "Whenever Wherever Whatever" – Maxwell
 "Fly Like an Eagle" – Seal
 "Barely Breathing" – Duncan Sheik

 Best Pop Performance by a Duo or Group with Vocal
 "Virtual Insanity" – Jamiroquai "Silver Springs" – Fleetwood Mac
 "MMMBop" – Hanson
 "Don't Speak" – No Doubt
 "Anybody Seen My Baby?" – The Rolling Stones

 Best Pop Collaboration with Vocals
 "Don't Look Back" – John Lee Hooker with Van Morrison "How Come, How Long" – Babyface & Stevie Wonder
 "God Bless the Child" – Tony Bennett with Billie Holiday
 "I Finally Found Someone" – Barbra Streisand & Bryan Adams
 "Tell Him" – Barbra Streisand & Celine Dion

 Best Pop Instrumental Performance
 "Last Dance" – Sarah McLachlan "Song for My Brother" – George Benson
 "An Gaoth Aneas" – The Chieftains
 "Havana" – Kenny G
 "Soulful Strut" – Grover Washington Jr.

 Best Dance Recording
 "Carry On" – Donna Summer & Giorgio Moroder "Da Funk" – Daft Punk
 "Ooh Aah... Just a Little Bit" – Gina G
 "To Step Aside" – Pet Shop Boys
 "Space Jam" – Quad City DJ's

 Best Pop Album
 Hourglass – James Taylor; Frank Filipetti & James Taylor, producers This Fire – Paula Cole; Paula Cole, producer
 The Dance – Fleetwood Mac; Lindsey Buckingham & Elliot Scheiner, producers
 Travelling Without Moving – Jamiroquai; Jay Kay & Al Stone, producers
 Surfacing – Sarah McLachlan; Pierre Marchand, producer

 Best Traditional Pop Vocal Performance 

 Tony Bennett on Holiday – Tony Bennett Julie Andrews Broadway/Here I'll Stay – Julie Andrews
 Mothers & Daughters – Rosemary Clooney
 Sondheim, Etc., – Live at Carnegie Hall – Bernadette Peters
 Film Noir – Carly Simon

 Alternative 
Best Alternative Music PerformanceOK Computer – RadioheadHomogenic – Björk 
Earthling – David Bowie 
Dig Your Own Hole – The Chemical Brothers 
The Fat of the Land – Prodigy

 Blues 
 Best Traditional Blues Album
 John Lee Hooker for Don't Look Back

 Best Contemporary Blues Album
 Taj Mahal for Señor Blues

 Children's 

 Best Musical Album for Children
 Roger Nichols, Kris O'Connor (producers) and John Denver (producer and artist) for All Aboard!
 Best Spoken Word Album for Children
 John McElroy (producer) and Charles Kuralt for Winnie-the-Pooh

 Comedy 

 From 1994 through 2003, see "Best Spoken Comedy Album" under the "Spoken" field, below.

 Classical 

 Best Orchestral Performance
 Pierre Boulez (conductor) and the Cleveland Orchestra for Berlioz: Symphonie Fantastique; Tristia
 Best Classical Vocal Performance
 Cecilia Bartoli for An Italian Songbook (Works of Bellini, Donizetti, Rossini)
 Best Opera Recording
 Michael Woolcock (producer), Georg Solti (conductor), José van Dam, Ben Heppner, Herbert Lippert, Karita Mattila, Alan Opie, Rene Pape, Iris Vermillion and the Chicago Symphony Orchestra for Wagner: Die Meistersinger von Nürnberg
 Best Choral Performance
 Robert Shaw (conductor) and the Atlanta Symphony Orchestra and Chorus for Adams: Harmonium/Rachmaninoff: The Bells
 Best Instrumental Soloist(s) Performance (with orchestra)
 David Zinman (conductor), Yo-Yo Ma and the Philadelphia Orchestra for Premieres – Cello Concertos (Works of Danielpour, Kirchner, Rouse)
 Best Instrumental Soloist Performance (without orchestra)
 János Starker for Bach: Suites for Solo Cello Nos. 1 – 6
 Best Small Ensemble Performance (with or without conductor)
 Claudio Abbado (conductor) for "Hindemith: Kammermusik No. 1 With Finale 1921, Op. 24 No. 1" performed by members of the Berlin Philharmonic
 Best Chamber Music Performance
 Emerson String Quartet for Beethoven: The String Quartets
 Best Classical Contemporary Composition
 John Adams (composer), Kent Nagano (conductor) and the Hallé Orchestra for "Adams: El Dorado"
 Best Classical Album
 Steven Epstein (producer), David Zinman (conductor), Yo-Yo Ma and the Philadelphia Orchestra for Premieres – Cello Concertos (Works of Danielpour, Kirchner, Rouse)

 Composing and arranging 

 Best Instrumental Composition
 Wayne Shorter (composer) for "Aung San Suu Kyi" performed by Herbie Hancock and Wayne Shorter
 Best Song Written Specifically for a Motion Picture or for Television
 R. Kelly (songwriter) for "I Believe I Can Fly" (from Space Jam)
 Best Instrumental Composition Written for a Motion Picture or for Television
 Gabriel Yared (composer) for The English Patient
 Best Instrumental Arrangement
 Bill Holman (arranger) for "Straight, No Chaser" performed by The Bill Holman Band
 Best Instrumental Arrangement Accompanying Vocal(s)
 Slide Hampton (arranger) for "Cotton Tail" performed by Dee Dee Bridgewater

 Country 

 Best Female Country Vocal Performance
 Trisha Yearwood for "How Do I Live"
other nominees
Deana Carter – "Did I Shave My Legs For This?"
Patty Loveless – "The Trouble with the Truth"
LeAnn Rimes – "How Do I Live"
Pam Tillis – "All the Good Ones Are Gone"

 Best Male Country Vocal Performance
 Vince Gill for "Pretty Little Adriana"
 Best Country Performance by a Duo or Group with Vocal
 Alison Krauss and Union Station for "Looking in the Eyes of Love"
 Best Country Collaboration with Vocals
 Garth Brooks and Trisha Yearwood for "In Another's Eyes"
 Best Country Instrumental Performance
 Alison Krauss and Union Station for "Little Liza Jane"
 Best Country Song
 Bob Carlisle and Randy Thomas (songwriters) for "Butterfly Kisses" performed by Bob Carlisle / Jeff Carson / the Raybon Brothers
other nominees
Bob McDill & Dean Dillon for "All the Good Ones Are Gone" (Pam Tillis)
Deana Carter & Rhonda Hart for "Did I Shave My Legs For This?" (Deana Carter)
Bobby Wood, John Peppard & Garth Brooks for "In Another's Eyes" (Garth Brooks & Trisha Yearwood)
Stephony Smith for "It's Your Love" (Tim McGraw & Faith Hill)

 Best Country Album
 Rick Rubin (producer) and Johnny Cash for Unchained
 Best Bluegrass Album
 Alison Krauss and Union Station for So Long So Wrong

 Folk 

 Best Traditional Folk Album
 BeauSoleil for L'amour ou la Folie
 Best Contemporary Folk Album
 Bob Dylan for Time Out of Mind

 Gospel 

 Best Pop/Contemporary Gospel Album
 Jars of Clay for Much Afraid
 Best Rock Gospel Album
 dc Talk for Welcome to the Freak Show
 Best Traditional Soul Gospel Album
 The Fairfield Four for I Couldn't Hear Nobody Pray
 Best Contemporary Soul Gospel Album
 Take 6 for Brothers
 Best Southern, Country or Bluegrass Gospel Album
 Peter York (producer) for Amazing Grace 2: A Country Salute to Gospel performed by various artists
 Best Gospel Choir or Chorus Album
 Myron Butler, Kirk Franklin and Robert Searight II (choir directors) for God's Property from Kirk Franklin's Nu Nation performed by God's Property

 Historical 

 Best Historical Album
 Amy Horowitz, Jeff Place and Pete Reiniger (producers), David Glasser and Charlie Pilzer (engineers) for Anthology of American Folk Music (1997 Edition Expanded) performed by various artists

 Jazz 

 Best Jazz Instrumental Solo
 Doc Cheatham and Nicholas Payton for "Stardust"
 Best Jazz Instrumental Performance, Individual or Group
 Charlie Haden and Pat Metheny for "Beyond the Missouri Sky (Short Stories)"
 Best Large Jazz Ensemble Performance
 Joe Henderson for "Big Band" performed by the Joe Henderson Big Band
 Best Jazz Vocal Performance
 Dee Dee Bridgewater for Dear Ella
 Best Contemporary Jazz Performance
 Randy Brecker for Into the Sun
 Best Latin Jazz Performance
 Roy Hargrove's Crisol for Habana

 Latin 

 Best Latin Pop Performance
 Luis Miguel for Romances
 Best Tropical Latin Performance
 Ry Cooder for Buena Vista Social Club
 Best Mexican-American/Tejano Music Performance
 La Mafia for En Tus Manos
 Best Latin Rock/Alternative Performance
 Los Fabulosos Cadillacs for Fabulosos Calavera

 Musical show 
 Best Musical Show Album
 Jay David Saks (producer) for Chicago the Musical performed by Various Artists featuring Ann Reinking, Bebe Neuwirth, James Naughton and Joel Grey

 New Age 

 Best New Age Album
 Michael Hedges for Oracle

 Packaging and notes 
 Best Recording Package
 Al Quattrocchi, Hugh Brown and Jeff Smith (art directors) for Titanic – Music as Heard on the Fateful Voyage performed by Various Artists

 Best Boxed Recording Package
 David Gorman, Hugh Brown and Rachel Gutek (art directors) for Beg Scream and Shout! The Big Ol' Box of '60s Soul performed by Various Artists

 Best Album Notes
 Chuck Pirtle, Eric von Schmidt, Jeff Place, John Fahey, Jon Pankake, Kip Lornell, Lucy Sante, Luis Kemnitzer, Neil V. Rosenberg and Peter Stampfel (notes writers) for Anthology of American Folk Music (1997 Edition Expanded) performed by Various Artists

 Polka 

 Best Polka Album
 Jimmy Sturr for Living on Polka Time

 Production and engineering 

 Best Engineered Album, Non-Classical
 Frank Filipetti (engineer) for Hourglass performed by James Taylor
 Best Engineered Album, Classical
 Michael J. Bishop, Jack Renner (engineers), Erich Kunzel (conductor) and the Cincinnati Pops Orchestra for Copland: The Music of America (Fanfare for the Common Man; Rodeo, etc.)
 Producer of the Year, Non-Classical
 Babyface
 Producer of the Year, Classical
 Steven Epstein
 Remixer of the Year, Non-Classical
 Frankie Knuckles

 R&B 

 Best Female R&B Vocal Performance Erykah Badu- "On & On" Chaka Khan- "Summertime"
 Mariah Carey- "Honey"
 Patti LaBelle- "When You Talk About Love"
 Whitney Houston- "I Believe in You and Me"
 Best Male R&B Vocal Performance R. Kelly- "I Believe I Can Fly" Curtis Mayfield- "Back to Living Again"
 Kenny Lattimore- "For You"
 Luther Vandross- "When You Call On Me/Baby That's When I Come Runnin"
 Usher- "You Make Me Wanna..."
 Best R&B Performance by a Duo or Group with Vocal Blackstreet- "No Diggity" Az Yet & Peter Cetera- "Hard to Say I'm Sorry"
 Boyz II Men- "A Song for Mama"
 God's Property & Salt- "Stomp"
 Take 6- "You Don't Have to Be Afraid"
 Best R&B Song R. Kelly (songwriter) for "I Believe I Can Fly"  Andre Young, Chauncey Hannibal, Teddy Riley, William Stewart, Lynise Walters, Richard Vick, & Bill Withers for "No Diggity" (Blackstreet)
  Erykah Badu & Jaborn Jamal for "On & On" (Erykah Badu)
  Kirk Franklin for "Stomp" (God's Property featuring Kirk Franklin & Salt)
  Mariah Carey, Puff Daddy, Stevie J, Q-Tip, Bobby Robinson, Stephen Hague, Ronald Larkins, Malcolm McLaren, & Larry Price for "Honey" (Mariah Carey)
 Best R&B Album Erykah Badu- Baduizm
 Babyface - The Day
 Mary J. Blige- Share My World
 Boyz II Men-  Evolution 
 Patti LaBelle-  Flame 
 Whitney Houston-  The Preacher's Wife: Original Soundtrack Album

Rap 
 Best Rap Solo Performance
 "Men in Black" – Will Smith
 "Put Your Hands Where My Eyes Could See" – Busta Rhymes
 "The Rain (Supa Dupa Fly)" – Missy "Misdemeanor" Elliott
 "Ain't Nobody" – LL Cool J
 "Hypnotize" – The Notorious B.I.G.

 Best Rap Performance by a Duo or Group
 "I'll Be Missing You" – Puff Daddy & Faith Evans featuring 112
 "Can't Nobody Hold Me Down" – Puff Daddy featuring Mase
 "Guantanamera" – Wyclef Jean featuring Celia Cruz & Jeni Fujita
 "Not Tonight" – Lil' Kim featuring Da Brat, Left Eye, Missy "Misdeameanor" Elliott & Angie Martinez
 "Mo Money Mo Problems" – The Notorious B.I.G. featuring Mase & Puff Daddy

 Best Rap Album
 No Way Out – Puff Daddy & The Family; Sean "Puffy" Combs & Stevie J., producers
 Supa Dupa Fly – Missy "Misdemeanor" Elliott
 Wyclef Jean Presents The Carnival – Wyclef Jean 
 Life After Death – The Notorious B.I.G.
 Wu-Tang Forever – Wu-Tang Clan

Reggae 

 Best Reggae Album
 Beenie Man for Many Moods of Moses
 Ziggy Marley & the Melody Makers for Fallen Is Babylon
 Shaggy for Midnite Lover
 Buju Banton for Inna Heights

Rock 

 Best Female Rock Vocal Performance
 Fiona Apple for "Criminal"
 Best Male Rock Vocal Performance
 Bob Dylan for "Cold Irons Bound"
 Best Rock Performance by a Duo or Group with Vocal
 The Wallflowers for "One Headlight"
 Best Rock Instrumental Performance
 The Chemical Brothers for "Block Rockin' Beats"
 Best Hard Rock Performance
 The Smashing Pumpkins for "The End Is the Beginning Is the End"
 Best Metal Performance
 Tool for "Ænema"
 Best Rock Song
 Jakob Dylan (songwriter) for "One Headlight" performed by The Wallflowers
 Best Rock Album
 John Fogerty for Blue Moon Swamp

Spoken 
 Best Spoken Word Album
 Charles Kuralt for Charles Kuralt's Spring

 Best Spoken Comedy Album
 Chris Rock for Roll with the New

Traditional pop 

 Best Traditional Pop Vocal Performance
 Tony Bennett for Tony Bennett on Holiday

World 

 Best World Music Album
 Milton Nascimento for Nascimento

Music video 
 Best Short Form Music Video
 "Got 'til It's Gone" – Janet Jackson
 Mark Romanek, video director; Aris McGarry, video producer
 "How Come, How Long" – Babyface featuring Stevie Wonder
 F. Gary Gray, video director; Craig Fanning, video producer
 "I Care 'Bout You" – Milestone
 Mark Gerard, video director; Melinda Nugent, video producer
 "Early to Bed" – Morphine
 Jamie Caliri, video director; Adam Stern, video producer
 "Stinkfist" – Tool 
 Adam Jones, video director; Donna Langston & Kevin Willis, video producers

 Best Long Form Music Video
 Jagged Little Pill, Live'' – Alanis Morissette
 Alanis Morissette & Steve Purcell, video directors; Glen Ballard, David May, Alanis Morissette & Steve Purcell, video producers
 Letters from a Porcupine – Blind Melon
 Steve MacCorkle, video director; Steve MacCorkle, video producer
  Forever's a Long, Long Time – Orquestra Was
 Don Was, video director; Larry Shapiro, video producer
 Live in Amsterdam: Wildest Dreams Tour – Tina Turner
 David Mallet, video director; Monique Ten Berge & Patrick Roubroeks, video producers
 Blue Note: A Story of Modern Jazz'' – Various Artists
 Julian Benedikt, video director; Ulli Pfau, video producer

Special merit awards

MusiCares Person of the Year 

 Luciano Pavarotti

Grammy Legend Award 

 Luciano Pavarotti

References 

 040
1998 in New York City
1998 music awards
Radio City Music Hall
1998 in American music
Grammy
February 1998 events in the United States